Daria Riazanova (born 24 August 2000) is a Russian weightlifter. She won the bronze medal in the women's 87kg event at the 2021 European Weightlifting Championships held in Moscow, Russia.

Career 
Daria Riazanova was born on 24 August 2000. 

She competed at 2015 Youth World Championships in the women's +69kg event and finished seventh with 186 kg in total. She won the bronze medal at 2015 Youth European Championships with 197 kg.  Next year she won the silver medal in same event with a total result 15 kg better than last year. She won 2017 Youth World Championships in the women's +75kg event.  

She became European Junior champion in 2017 in women's 90kg event with 231 kg in total (100 kg in snatch, 131 kg in clean&jerk). In following year she won the silver medal at World Junior Championships. She competed in new event 87kg and finished it with 98 kg in snatch and 132 kg in clean&jerk. 

In 2021 Riazanova won the silver medal in the women's 87kg at Russian National Championships in Grozny with 230 kg in total.  Then she won the bronze medal at 2021 European Championships in Moscow behind Daria Akhmerova of Russia and Elena Cîlcic of Moldova.  Riazanova said her medal was "a step to more valuable awards".

References

External links 
 

Living people
2000 births
Russian female weightlifters
European Weightlifting Championships medalists
21st-century Russian women